Muehlenbeckia or maidenhair is a genus of flowering plants in the family Polygonaceae. It is native to the borders of the Pacific, including South and North America, Papua New Guinea and Australasia. It has been introduced elsewhere, including Europe. Species vary in their growth habits, many being vines or shrubs. In some environments, rampant species can become weedy and difficult to eradicate.

Description
Species of Muehlenbeckia vary considerably in their growth habits; they may be perennials, vinelike, or shrubs. All have rhizomatous roots. Their leaves are arranged alternately on the stem, usually with stalks (petioles), but sometimes stalkless (sessile). The brownish ocrea is short and tubular, soon disintegrating. The inflorescences may be terminal or axillary, and are in the form of spikes or clusters, with at most very short peduncles (flowering stems). Individual flowers have pedicels (stalks). The flowers may be bisexual or unisexual, with sometimes a mixture of staminate, pistillate and bisexual flowers on the same plant. There are five white to greenish white tepals, joined at the base. Staminate flowers have 8 (sometimes 9) stamens and a rudimentary pistil. Pistillate flowers have rudimentary stamens and three spreading styles. The fruit is in the form of a black or dark brown unwinged achene, three-sided to more or less globe-shaped, at least partly enclosed by the persistent tepals.

Taxonomy
The genus was erected by Carl Meissner in 1841, initially for two species that he distinguished from Coccoloba and Polygonum. The generic name honours Alsatian bryologist Heinrich Gustav Mühlenbeck (1798–1845).

Muehlenbeckia is placed in the tribe Polygoneae of the subfamily Polygonoideae. Within the tribe, it is most closely related to the genera Reynoutria and Fallopia s.s., forming the so-called "RMF clade".

Species
, Plants of the World Online recognized 24 species (see note below):

 Muehlenbeckia adpressa (Labill.) Meisn. – climbing lignum, shrubby creeper, pohuehue (see note below)
 Muehlenbeckia andina Brandbyge
 Muehlenbeckia astonii Petrie – shrubby tororaro, wiggy-wig bush
 Muehlenbeckia australis (G.Forst.) Meisn. (see note below)
 Muehlenbeckia axillaris (Hook. f.) Walp. – sprawling wirevine
 Muehlenbeckia complexa (A. Cunn.) Meisn. – maidenhair vine, creeping wire vine, lacy wire vine, mattress vine, mattress wire weed, necklace vine, wire vine
 Muehlenbeckia diclina (F.Muell.) F.Muell. – slender lignum
 Muehlenbeckia ephedroides (Hook. f.) Hook. f. – leafless pohuehue or leafless muehlenbeckia
 Muehlenbeckia fruticulosa (Walp.) Standl.
 Muehlenbeckia gracillima Meisn.
 Muehlenbeckia gunnii (Hook.f.) Endl. – coastal lignum
 Muehlenbeckia hastulata (Sm.) I.M. Johnst. – wirevine
 Muehlenbeckia monticola Pulle
 Muehlenbeckia nummularia H.Gross
 Muehlenbeckia platyclada (F.Muell.) Meisn.
 Muehlenbeckia polybotrya Meisn.
 Muehlenbeckia rhyticarya Benth.
 Muehlenbeckia sagittifolia Meisn.
 Muehlenbeckia tamnifolia (Kunth) Meisn.
 Muehlenbeckia tiliifolia Wedd.
 Muehlenbeckia triloba Danser
 Muehlenbeckia tuggeranong Mallinson – Tuggeranong lignum
 Muehlenbeckia urubambensis Brandbyge
 Muehlenbeckia volcanica (Benth.) Endl.
 Muehlenbeckia zippelii (Meisn.) Danser

Some sources, including Plants of the World Online, regard M. adpressa as a synonym of M. australis. Others treat them as separate species.

Three species have been transferred to the genus Duma:
 Muehlenbeckia coccoloboides J.M.Black → Duma coccoloboides
 Muehlenbeckia florulenta Meisn. – tangled lignum → Duma florulenta
 Muehlenbeckia horrida H.Gross → Duma horrida

Distribution
Native
Australasia:
Australia: Australian Capital Territory, New South Wales, Norfolk Island, Northern Territory, Queensland, South Australia, Tasmania, Victoria, Western Australia
New Zealand: Chatham Islands, New Zealand North, New Zealand South
Papuasia: New Guinea
Neotropic:
Central America: Honduras
Southern South America: Chile

Invasiveness
All members of the RMF clade appear to have the potential to become invasive, in some cases via vigorous hybrids. The highly invasive Japanese knotweed (Reynoutria japonica) hybridizes with Muehlenbeckia australis. The related Muehlenbeckia complexa has established populations in southern parts of Britain and in the Channel Islands, and is a problematic invasive species in the San Francisco area.

References

External links

 
Polygonaceae genera
Taxa named by Carl Meissner